Lotta is given name and nickname that is a diminutive of Charlotte and Charlotta. Notable people with this name include the following:

Given name

 Lotta Henttala (born 1989), Finnish racing cyclist
 Lotta Hintsa (born 1988), Finnish beauty queen
 Lotta Hitschmanova (1909–1990), Canadian humanitarian
 Lotta Hetler James (1876–1945), American public speaker
 Lotta Lindgren, whose stage name is Léon (born 1993), Swedish singer and songwriter
Lotta Linthicum (1870s–1952), American actress
 Lotta Losten (born 1981), Swedish actress, designer, and photographer
 Lotta Nieminen (born 1986), Finnish illustrator and graphic designer
 Lotta Ökvist (born 1997), Swedish footballer
 Lotta Runesson (born 1981), Swedish footballer
 Lotta Sollander (born 1953), Swedish alpine skier
 Lotta Wahlin (born 1983), Swedish professional golfer

Nicknames

 Lotta Bromé, nickname of Charlotta Bromé (born 1964), Swedish presenter and host
 Lotta Crabtree, nickname of Charlotte Mignon Crabtree (1847–1924), American stage actress
 Lotta Engberg, nickname of Anna Charlotte Engberg (born Pedersen; 1963), Swedish singer, actress and television host
 Lotta Faust, nickname of Charlotte Faust (1880–1910), American stage actress
 Lotta Falkenbäck, nickname of Charlotte Falkenbäck (born 1959), Swedish skater
 Lotta Hedlund, nickname of Charlotte Jean Hedlund (born Charlotte Jean Butler; March 10, 1944), American-Swedish singer
 Lotta Schelin, nickname of Charlotta Eva Schelin (born 1984), Swedish professional footballer
 Lotta Sparre, nickname of Charlotta Sparre (1719 – 1795), Swedish noble and courtier
 Lotta Triven, pseudonym of Charlotta Frölich, Swedish writer

Fictional characters
 Lotta, a character from Enid Blyton's The Circus Series
 Lotta, a 1992 character from Astrid Lindgren's children's books
 Lotta, a character from the children's series Charlie and Lola
 Little Lotta, the title character of the Little Lotta comic series
 Lotta, character on Harvey Girls Forever! and pseudonym of Little Lotta
 Lotta Hart, character on Ace_Attorney

See also

Eva-Lotta Kiibus
Lota (name)
Lotta (disambiguation)
Lotte (name)
Lotti (given name)
Lotty

Finnish feminine given names